In chemistry, tetraborate or pyroborate is an anion (negative ion) with formula ; or a salt containing that anion, such as sodium tetraborate, .  It is one of the boron oxoacids, that is, a borate.

The name is also applied to the hydrated ion  as present in borax

The ion occurs in boric acid solutions at neutral pH, being formed by condensation of orthoborate and tetrahydroxyborate anions:

 2 B(OH)3 + 2  ⇌  + 5 H2O

The tetraborate anion (tetramer) includes two tetrahedral and two trigonal boron atoms symmetrically assembled in a fused bicyclic structure. The two tetrahedral boron atoms are linked together by a common oxygen atom, and each also bears a negative net charge brought by the supplementary OH− groups laterally attached to them. This intricate molecular anion also exhibits three rings: two fused distorted hexagonal (boroxole) rings and one distorted octagonal ring. Each ring is made of a succession of alternate boron and oxygen atoms. Boroxole rings are a very common structural motif in polyborate ions.

The hydrated tetraborate anion occurs in the mineral borax (sodium tetraborate octahydrate) with the formula Na2[B4O5(OH)4]·8H2O. The borax chemical formula is also commonly written in a more compact notation as Na2B4O7·10H2O. Sodium borate can be obtained in high purity and so can be used to make a standard solution in titrimetric analysis.

References

Anions
Salts
Sodium
Borates